Music Reports serves individuals and organizations seeking expertise and solutions in music rights licensing, administration, royalty accounting, and software development and hosting. Music Reports operates the largest registry of worldwide music rights and related business information.

History
Music Reports was established to enable local television broadcasters seeking alternatives to the rigid blanket licensing structures offered by BMI and ASCAP. Music Reports developed an administration service to allow television composers to license television stations directly, pursuant to a collection, music usage information, processing of television station schedules and revenues, and automated report preparation and submission to the PROs of specific, granular music usage information.

Following the signing of the Digital Millennium Copyright Act in 1998, Music Reports initiated a program of copyright licensing for digital music services including through a sister company called Royalty Logic, Inc. In doing so, the company played a significant role in the development of music streaming services, both interactive and non-interactive.

Overview of current services
Music Reports provides services in the following areas:
 Administration of ASCAP, BMI and SESAC per program licenses for television broadcasters, cable networks, and streaming networks.
 Master, synchronization, mechanical, and performing rights licensing for broadcasters, film and television producers, cable programming services, OTT services, and streaming music services.
 Cue sheet management, analytics, and distribution.
 Enterprise-level licensing and royalty accounting services for digital media services, mobile device and carrier clients and content owners.
 Copyright research for users of sound recordings and musical compositions.

Music Reports has compiled and maintains Songdex, the world's largest database and registry of music rights, with information on over 120 million sound recordings and related musical compositions, publishers, and composers. Recently, Songdex.com was launched, which allows registered users access to its data. Music Reports currently serves as a per program license administrator for over 450 local television stations in the United States including many owned by ABC, CBS and NBC. The company undertakes music rights clearances, licensing and accounting for digital music services such as Amazon, Deezer, Flipagram, Microsoft, Pandora Music, iHeart Media, PlayNetwork, Soundtrack Your Brand, Hoopla, SiriusXM, Slacker, SoundCloud, Musical.ly, Tidal and MelodyVR. Music Reports provides copyright research, licensing and strategic consulting expertise to established and emerging content and technology businesses and consumer product companies.

References

Delaware Secretary of State Entity Search - Division of Corporations
 Billboard Article: Music Reports Hits 1 Million Songs Claimed Using Songdex  December 15, 2017
 Billboard Article: Christmas Classics From Mariah Carey & Wham! Among Most-Recorded Holiday Songs  December 5, 2017
 Billboard Article: Say You Want A Revolution: U.S. Copyright Office Clears Path For Digital June 24, 2016
 Billboard Article: Pandora Teams With Music Reports in Bid for Fuller Royalty Transparency June, 6, 2016
 Billboard Article: Music Reports Launches New Tool to Begin Solving 'The Database Problem'March 17, 2016
 Billboard Article: Future of Music Article: Will Artists Lose Royalties From Satellite Radio? August 11, 2011
 Billboard Article: Sirius XM Attempting to License Directly From Labels August 11, 2011
 Billboard Article: Music Publishers, RIAA To Continue Royalty Negotiations September 16, 2009
 Billboard Article: Court Declines To Rule On CRB July 10,2009
 Billboard Article: Federal Appeals Court Considers Motion Against CRB Judges March 19, 2009
 

Music organizations based in the United States
Music publishing